The third round of CONCACAF matches for 2018 FIFA World Cup qualification was played from 4 to 8 September 2015.

Format
A total of twelve teams (teams ranked 7–8 in the CONCACAF entrant list and ten second round winners) played home-and-away over two legs. The six winners advanced to the fourth round.

Seeding
The draw for the third round was held as part of the 2018 FIFA World Cup Preliminary Draw on 25 July 2015, starting 18:00 MSK (UTC+3), at the Konstantinovsky Palace in Strelna, Saint Petersburg, Russia.

The seeding was based on the FIFA World Rankings of August 2014 (shown in parentheses). The twelve teams were seeded into two pots:
Pot 3 contained the teams ranked 1–6 (i.e., Jamaica and Haiti, ranked 7–8 in the CONCACAF entrant list, plus four higher-ranked second round winners).
Pot 4 contained the teams ranked 7–12 (i.e., six lower-ranked second round winners).

Each tie contained a team from Pot 3 and a team from Pot 4, with the order of legs decided by draw.

Note: Bolded teams qualified for the fourth round.

Note: Guatemala were seeded into Pot 3 as they had more FIFA ranking points (203.24) than Saint Vincent and the Grenadines (202.53). In the FIFA World Rankings, teams shared the same ranking if their ranking points rounded to the same whole number.

Matches
|}

El Salvador won 2–0 on aggregate and advanced to the fourth round (Group A).

Canada won 4–1 on aggregate and advanced to the fourth round (Group A).

Haiti won 6–1 on aggregate and advanced to the fourth round (Group B).

Jamaica won 4–3 on aggregate and advanced to the fourth round (Group B).

Saint Vincent and the Grenadines won 3–2 on aggregate and advanced to the fourth round (Group C).

Guatemala won 2–1 on aggregate and advanced to the fourth round (Group C).

Goalscorers

References

External links

Qualifiers – North, Central America and Caribbean: Round 3, FIFA.com
World Cup Qualifying – Men, CONCACAF.com

3
Qual3